The 2022 Crèdit Andorrà Open was a professional tennis tournament played on indoor hard courts. It was the first edition of the tournament which is also part of the 2022 WTA 125 tournaments, offering a total of $115,000 in prize money. It took place at the Poliesportiu d'Andorra in Andorra la Vella, the capital city of the principality of Andorra between 28 November and 4 December 2022. It was the first ever WTA affiliated tennis tournament to be held in Andorra.

Champions

Singles

  Alycia Parks def.  Rebecca Peterson 6–1, 6–4

Doubles

  Cristina Bucșa /  Weronika Falkowska def.  Angelina Gabueva /  Anastasia Zakharova 7–6(7–4), 6–1

Singles entrants

Seeds 

 1 Rankings are as of 21 November 2022.

Other entrants 
The following players received a wildcard into the singles main draw:
  Alina Charaeva
  Georgina García Pérez
  Sabine Lisicki
  Nina Stojanović
  Zhang Shuai

The following players received entry into the singles main draw through protected ranking:
  Bibiane Schoofs
  Yanina Wickmayer

Withdrawals
Before the tournament
  Elina Avanesyan → replaced by  Jessika Ponchet
  Elisabetta Cocciaretto → replaced by  Rebecca Peterson
  Olga Danilović → replaced by  Joanne Züger
  Vitalia Diatchenko → replaced by  Lina Glushko
  Magdalena Fręch → replaced by  Anastasia Zakharova
  Léolia Jeanjean → replaced by  Weronika Falkowska
  Elizabeth Mandlik → replaced by  Kateryna Baindl
  Rebeka Masarova → replaced by  Carole Monnet
  Kristina Mladenovic → replaced by  Sophie Chang
  Nuria Párrizas Díaz → replaced by  Bibiane Schoofs
  Diane Parry → replaced by  Katrina Scott
  Kamilla Rakhimova → replaced by  Jaqueline Cristian
  Moyuka Uchijima → replaced by  Yanina Wickmayer
  Markéta Vondroušová → replaced by  Nigina Abduraimova
  Wang Xinyu → replaced by  Ana Konjuh

Doubles entrants

Seeds 

 1 Rankings as of 21 November 2022.

Other entrants 
The following pair received a wildcard into the doubles main draw:
  Georgina García Pérez /  Victoria Jiménez Kasintseva

References

External links
 Official website

2022 WTA 125 tournaments
2022 in Andorran sport
November 2022 sports events in Europe
December 2022 sports events in Europe